Algenib (from Arabic الجنب al-janb, "the flank" or الجانب al-jānib, "the flank") is a name of the following stars:
Gamma Pegasi (the only star recognised by the IAU with this name)
Alpha Persei (usually known as Mirfak)